The Five (lit. Mighty Bunch), also known as the Russian Five, Mighty Handful, The Mighty Five, and the New Russian School, were five prominent 19th-century Russian composers who worked together to create a distinct national style of classical music: Mily Balakirev (the leader), César Cui, Modest Mussorgsky, Nikolai Rimsky-Korsakov and Alexander Borodin. They lived in Saint Petersburg and collaborated from 1856 to 1870.

History

Name

In May 1867 the critic Vladimir Stasov wrote an article, titled Mr. Balakirev's Slavic Concert, covering a concert that had been performed for visiting Slav delegations at the "All-Russian Ethnographical Exhibition" in Moscow. The four Russian composers whose works were played at the concert were Mikhail Glinka, Alexander Dargomyzhsky, Mily Balakirev, and Nikolai Rimsky-Korsakov. The article ended with the following statement:

The expression "mighty handful" (Moguchaya kuchka, "Mighty Bunch") was mocked by enemies of Balakirev and Stasov: Aleksandr Serov, academic circles of the conservatory, the Russian Musical Society, and their press supporters. The group ignored critics and continued operating under the moniker. This loose collection of composers gathered around Balakirev now included Cui, Mussorgsky, Rimsky-Korsakov, and Borodin — the five who have come to be associated with the name "Mighty Handful", or sometimes "The Five". Gerald Abraham stated flatly in the Grove Dictionary of Music and Musicians that "they never called themselves, nor were they ever called in Russia, 'The Five'" (although today the Russian equivalent "Пятёрка" ("Pyatyorka") is occasionally used to refer to this group). In his memoirs, Rimsky-Korsakov routinely refers to the group as "Balakirev's circle", and occasionally uses "The Mighty Handful", usually with an ironic tone. He also makes the following reference to "The Five":

The Russian word kuchka also spawned the terms "kuchkism" and "kuchkist", which may be applied to artistic aims or works in tune with the sensibilities of the Mighty Handful.

The name of Les Six, an even looser collection of French-speaking composers, emulates that of "The Five".

Formation
The formation of the group began in 1856 with the first meeting of Balakirev and César Cui. Modest Mussorgsky joined them in 1857, Nikolai Rimsky-Korsakov in 1861, and Alexander Borodin in 1862. All the composers in The Five were young men in 1862. Balakirev was 25, Cui 27, Mussorgsky 23, Borodin the eldest at 28, and Rimsky-Korsakov just 18. They were all self-trained amateurs. Borodin combined composing with a career in chemistry. Rimsky-Korsakov was a naval officer (he wrote his First Symphony on a three-year naval voyage circumnavigating the globe). Mussorgsky had been in the prestigious Preobrazhensky Regiment of the Imperial Guard, and then in the civil service before taking up music; even at the height of his career in the 1870s he was forced by the expense of his drinking habit to hold down a full-time job in the State Forestry Department.

In contrast to the élite status and court connections of Conservatory composers such as Pyotr Ilyich Tchaikovsky, The Five were mainly from the minor gentry of the provinces. To some degree their esprit de corps depended on the myth, which they themselves created, of a movement that was more "authentically Russian," in the sense that it was closer to the native soil, than the classic academy. Spurred on by Russian nationalist ideas, the Five “sought to capture elements of rural Russian life, to build national pride, and to prevent western ideals from seeping into their culture.”

Before them, Mikhail Glinka and Alexander Dargomyzhsky had gone some way towards producing a distinctly Russian kind of music, writing operas on Russian subjects, but the Mighty Handful represented the first concentrated attempt to develop such a music, with Stasov as their artistic adviser and Dargomyzhsky as an elder statesman to the group, so to speak. The circle began to fall apart during the 1870s, no doubt partially due to the fact that Balakirev withdrew from musical life early in the decade for a period of time. All of "The Five" are buried in Tikhvin Cemetery in Saint Petersburg.

Musical language

Stylization

The musical language The Five developed set them far apart from the Conservatoire. This self-conscious Russian styling was based on two elements:

They tried to incorporate in their music what they heard in village songs, in Cossack and Caucasian dances, in church chants and the tolling of church bells (to the point where the bell tolling became a cliché). The Five's music became filled with imitative sounds of Russian life. They also tried to reproduce the long-drawn, lyrical and melismatic peasant song, what Glinka had once called "the soul of Russian music." Balakirev made this possible by his study of songs from the Volga in the 1860s. More than any previous anthology, his transcriptions artfully preserved the distinctive aspects of Russian folk music:
Tonal mutability
A tune seems to shift naturally from one tonal center to another, often ending up in a different key than the one in which the song began. This can produce a feeling of elusiveness, a lack of definition or of logical progression in the harmony. Even when stylized by The Five, this quality can make Russian music sound very different from the tonal structures of the West.
Heterophony
A melody is simultaneously rendered by two or more performers in different variations. This is improvised by the singers until the end, when the song reverts to a single melodic line.
Parallel fifths, fourths, and thirds
The effect lends Russian music a raw sonority missing entirely from the comparatively polished harmonies of Western music.
The Five also adopted a series of harmonic devices to create a distinct "Russian" style and color different from Western music. This "exotic" styling of "Russia" was not just self-conscious but entirely invented. None of these devices were actually used in Russian folk or church music:
Whole tone scale
Although Glinka did not invent this scale, his application of it in the opera Ruslan and Lyudmila (1842) — most recognizable at the end of the festive overture — provided a characteristic harmonic and melodic device. This scale in "Russian" works often suggests evil or ominous personages or situations. It was used by all the major composers from Tchaikovsky (the appearance of the Countess's ghost in The Queen of Spades) to Rimsky-Korsakov (in all his magic-story operas—Sadko, Kashchey the Deathless and The Invisible City of Kitezh). Claude Debussy also uses this scale in his music, taking this, among many things, from the Russians. Later it became a standard device in horror-movie scores.
The Russian submediant
Also linked to Glinka's Ruslan, this is a harmonic pattern (in major mode) in which one upper part proceeds from the dominant pitch chromatically to the submediant while the other harmony parts remain constant. The most basic form of this pattern can be shown as follows (beginning with typical tonic): root-position tonic triad → root-position augmented tonic triad → 1st inversion submediant minor triad. A famous example of the Russian submediant occurs in the very opening bars of the third movement of Rimsky-Korsakov's Scheherezade.
Diminished or octatonic scale
Rimsky-Korsakov first used this in his symphonic poem Sadko in 1867. This scale became a sort of Russian calling-card — a leitmotif of magic and menace used not just by Rimsky-Korsakov but all of his followers, above all Alexander Scriabin, Maurice Ravel, Igor Stravinsky and Olivier Messiaen (mode 2).
Modular rotation in sequences of thirds
The Five made this device of Franz Liszt their own to base a loose symphonic-poem type of structure. This way, they could avoid the rigid Western laws of modulation in sonata form, allowing the form of a musical composition to be shaped entirely by the "content" of the music (its programmatic statements and visual descriptions) rather than by formal laws of symmetry. This loose structure became especially important for Mussorgsky's Pictures at an Exhibition, a work that may have done more than any other to define the Russian style.
Pentatonic scale
This stylistic aspect became used by every Russian nationalist composer. Its distinctive feature is to have only five notes in the octave, rather than the seven of the heptatonic scales (e.g., major and minor). The pentatonic scale is one of the ways of suggesting a "primitive" folk-melodic style as well as the "Eastern" element (Middle East, Asia). A melodic example of the "major-mode" pentatonic scale (C-D-E-G-A) can be heard at the entrance of the chorus at the beginning of Borodin's Prince Igor.

Orientalism
One hallmark of "The Five" was its reliance on orientalism. Many quintessentially "Russian" works were composed in orientalist style, such as Balakirev's Islamey, Borodin's Prince Igor and Rimsky-Korsakov's Scheherazade. Orientalism, in fact, became widely considered in the West both one of the best-known aspects of Russian music and a trait of Russian national character. As leader of "The Five," Balakirev encouraged the use of eastern themes and harmonies to set their "Russian" music apart from the German symphonism of Anton Rubinstein and other Western-oriented composers. Because Rimsky-Korsakov used Russian folk and oriental melodies in his First Symphony, Stasov and the other nationalists dubbed it the "First Russian Symphony," even though Rubinstein had written his Ocean Symphony a dozen years before it. These were themes Balakirev had transcribed in the Caucasus. "The symphony is good," Cui wrote to Rimsky-Korsakov in 1863, while the latter was out on naval deployment. "We played it a few days ago at Balakirev's—to the great pleasure of Stassov. It is really Russian. Only a Russian could have composed it, because it lacks the slightest trace of any stagnant Germanness."

Orientalism was not confined to using authentic Eastern melodies. What became more important than the melodies themselves were the musical conventions added to them. These conventions allowed orientalism to become an avenue for writing music on subjects considered unmentionable otherwise, such as political themes and erotic fantasies. It also became a means of expressing Russian supremacy as the empire expanded under Alexander II. This was often reinforced through misogynist symbolism—the rational, active and moral Western man versus the irrational, passive and immoral Eastern woman.

Two major works entirely dominated by orientalism are Rimsky-Korsakov's symphonic suite Antar and Balakirev's symphonic poem Tamara. Antar, set in Arabia, uses two different styles of music, Western (Russian) and Eastern (Arabian). The first theme, Antar's, is masculine and Russian in character. The second theme, feminine and oriental in melodic contour, belongs to the queen, Gul Nazar. Rimsky-Korsakov was able to soften the implicit misogyny to some extent. However, female sensuality does exert a paralyzing, ultimately destructive influence. With Gul Nazar extinguishing Antar's life in a final embrace, the woman overcomes the man.

Balakirev gives a more overtly misogynistic view of oriental women in Tamara. He had originally planned to write a Caucasan dance called a lezginka, modeled on Glinka, for this work. However, he discovered a poem by Mikhail Lermontov about the beautiful Tamara, who lived in a tower alongside the gorge of Daryal. She lured travelers and allowed them to enjoy a night of sensual delights, only to kill them and throw their bodies into the River Terek. Balakirev uses two specific codes endemic to orientalism in writing Tamara. The first code, based on obsessive rhythms, note repetitions, climactic effects and accelerated tempi, represents Dionysian intoxication. The second code, consisting of unpredictable rhythms, irregular phrasing and based on long passages with many repeat notes, augmented and diminished intervals and extended melismas, depict sensual longing. Not only did Balakirev use these codes extensively, but he also attempted to supercharge them further when he revised the orchestration of Tamara in 1898.

Quotations
Rimsky-Korsakov provides the following picture of "The Mighty Handful" in his memoirs, Chronicle of My Musical Life (translated by J. A. Joffe):

Tastes

Balakirev

Abilities

Influence
Except perhaps for Cui, the members of this group influenced or taught many of the great Russian composers who were to follow, including Alexander Glazunov, Mikhail Ippolitov-Ivanov, Sergei Prokofiev, Igor Stravinsky, and Dmitri Shostakovich. They also influenced the two French symbolist composers Maurice Ravel and Claude Debussy through their radical tonal language.

Timeline

See also
 Belyayev circle, successors to The Five
 List of Russian composers
 Tchaikovsky and the Five
 American Five
 Group of Eight (music), Spanish composers
 Les Six

References

External links
 The Article about The Five in "1000 years of Russian Music"
 Russian musical influences of The Five on works of Claude Debussy

Russian classical composers
 
Articles which contain graphical timelines